Ononis oligophylla is a species of plants in the family Fabaceae.

Sources

References 

oligophylla